The minister of state for the armed forces is a mid-level ministerial position at the Ministry of Defence in the Government of the United Kingdom. 

When of Minister of State rank (until the appointment of James Heappey as a Parliamentary Under-Secretary of State in 2020), the office previously acted as the deputy to the secretary of state for defence. In July 2022, Heappey was promoted to Minister of State, with the title of the position reverting to its former name.

The corresponding shadow minister is the shadow minister for the armed forces.

Roles
The responsibilities of the minister of state for the armed forces are:

Operations and operational legal policy
Force generation (including exercises)
Military recruitment and retention policy (regulars and reserves)
Cyber
Permanent Joint Operating bases
International defence engagement strategy
Lead for defence engagement in Africa and Latin America
Human security
Operational public inquiries, inquests
Youth and cadets
Commemorations, ceremonial duties, medallic recognition and protocol policy and casework

List of Ministers and Under-Secretaries 

Colour key (for political parties):

Shadow Minister for the Armed Forces

References

External links 
 www.mod.uk

Ministry of Defence (United Kingdom)
Armed Forces
1981 establishments in the United Kingdom